The yellow-throated whistler (Pachycephala macrorhyncha) or Banda Sea whistler, is a species of bird in the family Pachycephalidae. It is endemic to central and south-eastern Wallacea, where it ranges from Timor east to the Tanimbars and north to Seram and Banggai (roughly equalling the islands in or adjacent to the Banda Sea). The oriole whistler is sometimes alternatively called the yellow-throated whistler, leading to confusion between both species.

Taxonomy and systematics 
The Yellow-throated whistler was originally described in the genus Myiolestes (a synonym for Colluricincla). The yellow-throated whistler is variably considered as either a subspecies of the Australian golden whistler or treated as a separate species, but strong published evidence in favour of either treatment is limited, and further study is warranted to resolve the complex taxonomic situation.

Subspecies 
The Baliem whistler, a former subspecies of the yellow-throated whistler, was re-classified as a separate species by the IOC in 2016. Currently, ten subspecies are recognized:
 P. m. calliope – Bonaparte, 1850: Originally described as a separate species. Found on Wetar, Timor and Semau (eastern Lesser Sundas)
 P. m. sharpei – Meyer, AB, 1884: Originally described as a separate species. Found on Babar Islands (eastern Lesser Sundas)
 P. m. dammeriana – Hartert, 1900: Found on Damar Island (eastern Lesser Sundas)
 P. m. par – Hartert, 1904: Originally described as a separate species. Found on Roma Island (eastern Lesser Sundas)
 P. m. compar – Hartert, 1904: Found on the islands of Leti and Moa (eastern Lesser Sundas)
 P. m. fuscoflava – Sclater, PL, 1883: Originally described as a separate species. Found on the Tanimbar Islands
 P. m. macrorhyncha – Strickland, 1849: Found on Ambon and Seram Islands (southern Moluccas)
 P. m. buruensis – Hartert, 1899: Found on Buru Island (southern Moluccas)
 P. m. clio – Wallace, 1863: Originally described as a separate species. Found on Sula Islands (northern Moluccas)
 P. m. pelengensis – Neumann, 1941: Found on Banggai Island (east of Sulawesi)

Description
Among the members of the golden whistler group, the yellow-throated whistler is bordered to the north by the black-chinned whistler, to the west by the rusty-breasted whistler, and to the south by the Australian golden whistler. The only subspecies of the yellow-throated whistler where the male is yellow-throated is fuscoflava from the Tanimbar Islands. Males of other subspecies are white-throated, except par (Romang Island) and compar (Leti Islands) where the plumages of the males are female-like.

References

yellow-throated whistler
Birds of Timor
Birds of the Lesser Sunda Islands
yellow-throated whistler